Toranj means tower in Serbian;
Croatian and  Bergamot in  Persian. It may refer to:

  Avalski toranj (sr) - Avala Tower; Belgrade, Serbia
 , a village near Pakrac, Croatia
 , a village near Velika, Croatia
 Toranj (album), Mohsen Namjoo's 2007 debut